Álvaro Baigorri del Río (born 11 August 1983) is a Spanish former professional footballer who played as a left-back.

Club career
Born in Madrid, Baigorri played lower league football until the age of 23, representing UD San Sebastián de los Reyes, Racing de Santander B, CD Leganés and Alicante CF. In summer 2006 he moved to CD Castellón, who had already acquired him the previous year.

Baigorri played his first game as a professional on 2 September 2006, featuring the second half of a 4–2 away loss against UD Vecindario in the Segunda División. He finished his first year with 29 matches, helping the Valencian Community team to the 14th position.

Baigorri scored his only goal in the second tier on 22 September 2007, Castellón's second in the 2–2 away draw with Sevilla Atlético. He left the club in June 2010 after it suffered relegation, and returned to the Segunda División B by joining AD Ceuta.

In January 2012, Baigorri moved abroad for the first time in his career, signing with Sarpsborg 08 FF from the Norwegian 1. divisjon. He joined another side in the country two years later, 2. divisjon's Moss FK.

Club statistics

References

External links

1983 births
Living people
Footballers from Madrid
Spanish footballers
Association football defenders
Segunda División players
Segunda División B players
Tercera División players
UD San Sebastián de los Reyes players
Rayo Cantabria players
CD Leganés players
CD Castellón footballers
Alicante CF footballers
AD Ceuta footballers
Eliteserien players
Norwegian First Division players
Sarpsborg 08 FF players
Moss FK players
Spanish expatriate footballers
Expatriate footballers in Norway
Spanish expatriate sportspeople in Norway